Danny García vs. Zab Judah, was a boxing unified super lightweight world championship fight for Garcia's Ring Junior Welterweight title, WBA Super Lightweight title and WBC Light Welterweight title. The bout was held on April 27, 2013, at the Barclays Center in  Brooklyn, New York on Showtime. The bout was originally set to be held on February 9, but was rescheduled due to a rib injury sustained by Garcia during training.

Garcia won the fight due to a unanimous decision. The official judges scored the fight 115-112, 114-112 and 116-111, per BoxRec.com

Fight card

Main Event
 Light Welterweight Championship bout:  Danny García vs.  Zab Judah

Undercard
 Middleweight Championship bout:  Peter Quillin vs.  Fernando Guerrero
 Middleweight bout:  Daniel Jacobs vs.  Billy Lyell
 Middleweight bout:  Boyd Melson vs.  Joshua Snyder
 Light Heavyweight:  Marcus Browne vs.  Taneal Goyco

References

External links
Showtime Sports
Golden Boy Promotions
Barclays Center

Boxing matches
2013 in boxing
Boxing matches in New York City
Events in Brooklyn, New York
Sports in Brooklyn
2013 in sports in New York City
Golden Boy Promotions
Boxing articles needing attention
April 2013 sports events in the United States